Aspect or Aspects may refer to:

Entertainment
 Aspect magazine, a biannual DVD magazine showcasing new media art
 Aspect Co., a Japanese video game company
 Aspects (band), a hip hop group from Bristol, England
 Aspects (Benny Carter album), a 1959 album by Benny Carter
 Aspects (The Eleventh House album), a 1976 album by Larry Coryell and The Eleventh House
Aspects (novel), a posthumous novel by John M. Ford

Persons
 Alain Aspect, a French physicist and Nobel prize recipient (1947–)

Other
 Aspect (computer programming), a feature linked to many parts of a program but not necessarily the primary function of the program
 Aspect (geography), the compass direction that a slope faces
 Aspect (religion),  a particular manifestation of a deity
 Aspect (trade union), a trade union in the United Kingdom
 Aspect Software, an American call center technology and customer experience company
 Astrological aspect, an angle the planets have to each other
 Grammatical aspect, in linguistics, a component of the conjugation of a verb, having to do with the internal temporal flow of an event
 Lexical aspect, in linguistics, a distinction among different kinds of verb according to their relation to time
 Aspect, the orientation of a map projection
 Aspects of the Theory of Syntax, a 1965 linguistics book by Noam Chomsky

See also
 Aspect ratio (disambiguation)